Adele Maria Bertei (born 1955) is an American singer, songwriter, writer and director.

Early life 

Bertei was born in Cleveland, Ohio in 1955. She is the oldest of three children born to Katherine (née Murphy) and Umberto Bertei. Her father was an Italian immigrant and her mother was of Irish and French Canadian descent.
Bertei and her brothers became wards of the state of Ohio, resulting in a childhood spent in foster homes, a Catholic convent school for wayward girls, and a reformatory in Ohio. Bertei never completed a formal education and is an autodidact.

She began writing poetry at a very young age and was discovered as a singer by legendary Cleveland musician Peter Laughner, who mentored her and convinced her to pursue a career in music.

Career in music 

Bertei began her career playing guitar and singing in the Wolves, her first band with Laughner. She left Cleveland for New York City in 1977 shortly after Laughner died prematurely of complications due to alcoholism.

Bertei quickly became a prominent figure in the no wave art and music scene in NYC, playing Acetone organ and guitar in the original line up of the Contortions fronted by James Chance. While working as personal assistant to Brian Eno in 1978, Bertei took him to a series of concerts at Artists Space in New York, which resulted in Eno producing the iconoclastic LP No New York for the Virgin/Antilles label, featuring the Contortions and three other no wave bands.

The artist Martin Kippenberger brought Bertei to Berlin in 1980 to perform solo at his SO36 club and on her return to the U.S., Bertei started the all-girl punk-funk band the Bloods with guitarist Kathy Rey. The Bloods are considered the first rock and roll band of gay women who were publicly out of the closet. The band toured internationally, opened for the Clash in New York and released the single "Button Up", a John Peel favorite on the Au Pair's label Exit Records in 1981. "Button Up" was re-released on the British label Soul Jazz Records as part of the compilation New York Noise, Volume 1, released in 2005.

After the Bloods disbanded, Bertei worked as a DJ in Amsterdam and upon returning to New York, was one of the first solo acts to be signed to Geffen Records in 1981. Thomas Dolby produced her first hit dance single "Build Me a Bridge", and the success of the single led to an album deal with Geffen, but the company had alienated Dolby. Says Bertei of this period in the early 1980s: "Back then, female performers couldn't be too wild, and certainly not outspokenly gay, even a little. Defying the rules had its consequences. This was exacerbated by the horrid reputation I had in the 1980s, some of it hyperbole but not all of it completely unfounded. Half-Piaf, half-Hemingway… singing and brawling. Wrestling in public with quite a few demons that I should have dragged to a therapist."

Dolby invited her to sing backing vocals on his next LP, The Flat Earth. Bertei sang a duet with him on the single "Hyperactive!" which became an international pop hit for Dolby. It was rumored that Dolby had vari-sped Bertei's voice for her high solo notes in the song but she proved the critics wrong, performing the song live on the Old Grey Whistle Test in 1984. She is alleged to have a three-octave range. During her years in London, Bertei sang backing vocals with various groups live and in the studio, including Culture Club and the Passions. She has written songs for artists as various as the Pointer Sisters, Sheena Easton, Thomas Dolby, Arthur Baker, Jellybean Benitez, the Anubian Lights, Lydia Lunch and Matthew Sweet.

Bertei signed with Chrysalis Records in 1985 and recorded her song "When It's Over" produced by David Gamson and Fred Maher of Scritti Politti, with Green Gartside providing guest vocals. Her concept for the music video was a performance in a women's prison. A legal misstep on the part of the record company prevented the single from being released and promoted and Bertei went on to produce her own LP with songwriting partner Ian Prince. Her anti-apartheid anthem "Little Lives, Big Love" charted high in Germany. During this period she joined Jellybean Benitez for his LP Just Visiting This Planet, co-writing several songs and singing lead on the international pop hit "Just a Mirage" in 1987. She performed the song with Jellybean on the UK's Top of the Pops that year.

Bertei continued to work as a backing vocalist, most notably for Tears for Fears' Sowing the Seeds of Love tour in 1990 where she also sang backing vocals for the opening act, Blondie's Deborah Harry. After a brief stint of touring with Sophie B. Hawkins as a backing singer, she moved to Los Angeles in 1993 and took a long hiatus from music to write and study directing. Since then her only musical outing has been with the Anubian Lights as lead singer in 2005 and Phantascope, a CD of co-produced and co-written songs on Nona Hendryx's label Rhythmbank. Bertei directed the music video for the Anubian Light's song "Wild Winter".

In 2010 Bertei returned to New York for two musical appearances backed by several of her old Contortions band-mates and Bowie bassist Gail Ann Dorsey. Her live solo performances are extremely rare. She is rumoured to be working on a solo collection of new and old previously unreleased songs.

Directing and film 

Striking a punk-waif look and attitude, Bertei was heavily involved in the underground film scene of the time, collaborating and appearing in films by the Irish filmmaker Vivienne Dick, Scott & Beth B., and in the feminist sci-fi film Born in Flames, directed by Lizzie Borden.

In the 1990s, Bertei directed several period pieces for the Showtime series Women: Stories of Passion and a soft-core comedy feature for Playboy, Secrets of a Chambermaid, which she directed in super-16 mm with an ensemble cast (featuring Mary Woronov of Warhol/Chelsea Girls fame) and a minuscule budget in seven days. She refers to Playboy as her film school period where she was paid to learn the craft. Dick Rosetti, president of production at Playboy Entertainment Group at the time, called the film the best feature Playboy had ever produced. Bertei directed a 35 mm teaser for her original screenplay The Ballad of Johnny Jane, and on the strength of the teaser and script, a then relatively unknown Angelina Jolie signed a letter of intent to play the lead in the film. Amanda Plummer appeared in the trailer and Bertei also had the support of cinematographer Bill Pope and costumer Arianne Phillips who committed to doing the film once the financing came through. However, no company would take a chance on a feature film about gay women with an all-female cast in 1996. She continues to direct behind-the-scenes programs and viral videos in the advertising world.

Writing 

Bertei has been awarded writing fellowships at the Virginia Center for the Creative Arts, as well as the Albert and Elaine Borchard Foundation fellowship for the Tomales Bay Workshops, specifically to work with Dorothy Allison in 2010.  In 2012 she ran a successful Kickstarter campaign to buy time toward her own writing work.

Currently Bertei works as a ghostwriter and director in Los Angeles where she resides. She is also the U.S. contributing editor-at-large for the Caribbean arts and culture magazine 6 Carlos. Bertei launched a website in 2011 and based on writing featured there, has been approached to pen her memoirs. She also blogs for the Huffington Post.

Bertei has written three books as well. Published in 2013, Bertei’s first book is “Peter and the Wolves” about her friendship with musician Peter Laughner and their journey through the 1970’s underground punk scene. The book was rereleased in 2021. Bertei’s second book, Why Labelle Matters, is about the cultural and musical progress achieved by Patti Labelle and the Bluebelles in the 1960’s. The newest book by Bertei is a memoir titled “Twist: An American Girl.” The release date is set for spring of 2023 with publisher ZE Books.

References

External links 
 Adele Bertei Official Website

1955 births
Living people
American people of Italian descent
American people of Irish descent
American people of French-Canadian descent
American women singer-songwriters
Musicians from Cleveland
Singer-songwriters from Ohio
James Chance and the Contortions members
21st-century American women